George Gaffikin (17 May 1868 – 31 December 1935) was an Irish footballer who played as an inside right.

Club career
Gaffikin was a founder member of Linfield, playing in their first ever game, a friendly game against Lisburn Distillery on 11 September 1886., and would go on to make 181 appearances in his twelve years with the club, scoring 103 goals. Gaffikin was part of the Linfield team which won the club's first trophy, the Irish Cup in March 1891, scoring in a 4-2 victory over Ulster, with Linfield also going on to win a domestic double the same season, a feat they would repeat for the following three seasons, and again in 1895, with Gaffikin scoring in the 10-1 Irish Cup win against Bohemians. Gaffikin would also score twice in the final of the Belfast Charity Cup in May 1891, with Linfield defeating Ulster 7-1. They would go on to win this competition for the next four seasons.

International career

Gaffikin made his debut for Ireland during the 1890-91 British Home Championship in a 2-5 defeat to Wales. He would go on to make 15 international appearances, scoring against Wales the following season during the 1891-92 British Home Championship as Ireland recorded a 7-2 win, and then in three successive international games, against Scotland, and the following season against England and Scotland in the 1892-93 British Home Championship tournament. During the game against England, Ireland were awarded the first penalty kick in international football, after Gaffikin was tripped, although Sam Torrans' kick was saved.

References

Irish association footballers (before 1923)
NIFL Premiership players
Association football forwards
Northern Ireland amateur international footballers
Pre-1950 IFA international footballers
Linfield F.C. players
1868 births
1935 deaths